Hafizabad is a tehsil of Hafizabad District in Punjab, Pakistan.

References

Tehsils of Punjab, Pakistan
Hafizabad District
Populated places in Hafizabad District